Zonulispira grandimaculata is a species of sea snail, a marine gastropod mollusk in the family Pseudomelatomidae, the turrids and allies.

Description
The length of the shell varies between 10 mm and 24 mm.

Distribution
This species occurs in the Pacific Ocean between Nicaragua and Panama.

References

 Adams, C. B. "Catalogue of shells collected at Panama, with notes on synonymy, station, and habitat." Annals of the New York Academy of Sciences 5.1 (1852): 229–549.

External links
 
 Gatsropods.com: Zonulispira grandimaculata.

grandimaculata
Gastropods described in 1852